Joseph Atubokiki Ajienka (born 10 January 1955) is a Nigerian  professor of Petroleum engineering, educational administrator  and the seventh vice chancellor of  University of Port Harcourt, Rivers State, Nigeria.

 Under his leadership, the University of Port Harcourt was ranked 6th in Africa and 1st in Nigeria in Research Influence by Times Higher Education (THE).

Life and career
He was born on January 10, 1955, in Okrika, a metropolitan area of Rivers State, Nigeria. He attended Okrika Boys’ School but obtained the West Africa School Certificate at Government Comprehensive Secondary School in Borokiri, Port Harcourt. He obtained a bachelor's degree in Petroleum engineering from the University of Ibadan and master's degree and Doctorate (Ph. D) degree from the University of Port Harcourt in 1986 and 1990 respectively. 
He joined the service of University of Port Harcourt in 1982 as a graduate assistant in Department of Petroleum engineering where he was later appointed a professor of Petroleum engineering.

Summary of major appointments and recognitions
Chairman Association of Vice-Chancellors of Nigerian Universities (AVCNU) 2014/5
Chairman Committee of Vice-Chancellors (CVC) of Federal Universities, 2014/5
7th Vice-Chancellor, University of Port Harcourt (July 12, 2010 – 2015)
Pioneer Director, Institute of Petroleum Studies (IPS), University of PH, (2003-2010)
Head of Department of Petroleum & Gas Engineering, (1995-1997)
Coordinator, M. Eng Environmental Engineering Programme, Faculty of Engineering, University of Port Harcourt (2000-2003)
Emmanuel Egbogah Chair of Petroleum Engineering, University of Port Harcourt (2005-)
Member, Governing Council, University of Port Harcourt (2006-2007)
Chairman, University of Port Harcourt Housing Committee (2006-2010)
Member, Graduate School Board, University of Port Harcourt (2002-2010)
Chairman, Graduate School Seminars & Lectures Committee (2006-2010)
Chairman 25th Anniversary of the School of Graduate Studies, University of PH, 2008

Fellowship and membership
Fellow of the Nigerian Academy of Engineering
Member of the Institute of Administrators and researchers of Nigeria
Fellow Nigerian Society of Engineers
Fellow, Nigeriam Environmental Society
Fellow, Nigerian Institute of Management
Fellow, Institute of Safety Professionals of Nigeria
Fellow, Institute of Petroleum Studies
Fellow, Institute of Industrial Administration

Honours and awards

Paul Haris Fellow (Rotary Club), 2012
Chieftaincy Title: Enyi Oha of Ebem Ohafia, 2012
NREP Global Award of Professionalism in Higher Education (2009)
Chairman Standard Organisation of Nigeria Committee on Petroleum Upstream (2009), elected
Selected to attend TOTAL International Seminar on Energy & Education, November 2007, Paris
SPE African Regional Award for Production and Operations, 2008
Nigeria Petroleum Golden Jubilee Award of Excellence, (Who is Who in 50 years of Oil and Gas Production in Nigeria), August 2008 organised by Nigerian Energy Chronicles
Rotary Club of Ogbor Hill Aba, 2000
Letter of Commendation from the University of Port Harcourt Central Appointment & Promotion Committee (Academic) for brilliant performance at the interview for the post of professor
Visiting Lecturer, Department of Fuel and Energy, University of Leeds, U.K., British Council sponsored University of Leeds/Uniport Energy Link (February 28 -March 31, 1992).
Safety Ambassador, ISPON 2014 Safety Award
Award of Honour, Faculty of Education, University of Port Harcourt, on the Occasion of 100 year of Education in Nigeria, November 11, 2014
Pan-African Leaders Award, African Students Union Parliament, ASUP, Sept 2014
Award of Honour, 3rd Registry Day Celebration, 29 October 2014
Award of Excellence Centre for Gas, Refining & Petrochemicals, PH, 2014
Recognition Award, Faculty of Agriculture, World Food Day, 2014
Award of Excellence, Association of Medical Lab. Students, June 2014
Award of Excellence by the Department of Theatre & Film Studies, Art Patron, 2014
SSLT 3rd Induction Distinguished Service Award, March 2014
Institute of Petroleum Studies 10th Anniversary Distinguished Service Award, 2013
University of PH School of Graduate Studies Silver Jubilee Award of Excellence, 2008
Institute of Petroleum Studies 5th Year Award of Excellence 2008
University of Port Harcourt Alumni Award of Excellence, 2008
Senior Staff Club Award of Excellence, 2004
Award of Excellence (4 February 2004), National Assoc. of Delta State Graduate Students, Uniport
SPE Uniport Chapter Service Award, 1996/97

Family

Professor Joseph Atubokiki Ajienka is married to Mrs Mercy Ajienka and they have children.

References

See also
List of vice chancellors in Nigeria
University of Port Harcourt

Engineers from Rivers State
Living people
Nigerian educational theorists
Educators from Rivers State
Academic staff of the University of Port Harcourt
Academic staff of the University of Ibadan
Academic staff of the University of Lagos
1955 births
People from Okrika